The Grand Jury (Ireland) Act 1838 (1 & 2 Vict. c. 37) was an Act of Parliament in the United Kingdom, signed into law on 29 July 1838. It established that bills of indictment laid before grand juries should be endorsed with the names of the witnesses, and empowered the juries to administer oaths or affirmations to the witnesses, which were to be taken under the normal penalties of perjury for falsehood.

References
The British almanac of the Society for the Diffusion of Useful Knowledge, for the year 1839. Society for the Diffusion of Useful Knowledge, London, 1839.

1838 in British law
United Kingdom Acts of Parliament 1838
Acts of the Parliament of the United Kingdom concerning Ireland
1838 in Ireland